Cookes is a surname. Notable people with the surname include:

Sir Thomas Cookes, 2nd Baronet (bap. 1648–1701), English philanthropist
Cookes baronets

See also
Cooke